"What's My Line" is a two-episode story in season two of the television series Buffy the Vampire Slayer.

In part one, Buffy endures Career Week at school while Spike hires assassins to kill her; a fierce fighter who identifies herself as "Kendra the Vampire Slayer" shows up in Sunnydale. In part two, Angel is kidnapped by Spike for a ritual in which Drusilla is restored to health.

Plot

Part one 
Spike works on a cure for Drusilla. Dalton, a vampire transcriber, is unable to decipher the book stolen from the library that contains a cure. Drusilla informs Spike that they need a key because the book is in code.

Buffy witnesses Dalton stealing an object from a mausoleum, but he escapes when she is distracted by another vampire. She enters her bedroom and finds Angel waiting to warn her of grave danger. Buffy reports to Giles, and he is concerned when she tells him about the theft from the mausoleum.

Spike and Drusilla examine the key stolen by Dalton, a gold cross. Spike decides to call the Order of Taraka, an ancient guild of assassins, to rid himself of Buffy once and for all. Back at school, Willow is taken into a secluded lounge area to be recruited by a leading software company, along with Oz, the boy who has been watching her for weeks. At the mausoleum, Giles realizes that Josephus du Lac, the author of the book stolen from the library, is buried there and that the book's key was taken from the mausoleum.

The assassins begin to arrive. A large, intimidating man exits a bus, and a door-to-door beauty salesman attacks Buffy's next-door neighbor. A young woman attacks an airplane worker in the cargo hold of a plane, escaping with little difficulty.

Giles tells Buffy, Xander, and Willow about the "du Lac Cross" which can be used as the key, and he enlists their help with further research. Buffy arrives at the ice skating stadium for a date with Angel. She is attacked, but Angel arrives in time to help her fight off the assassin, whom she kills with the blade of her skate. Angel, recognizing the assassin's ring as the symbol of the Order of Taraka, warns Buffy that she should leave Sunnydale and hide. The female from the plane watches from the shadows.

The assassin next-door to Buffy's house feeds on the neighbor's body by disintegrating into hundreds of writhing mealworms, which can reshape themselves into limbs at will. Buffy is paranoid and jittery, suspicious of each person who passes by in the hallways at school, including Oz. Buffy arrives at Angel's empty home and falls asleep in his bed. Angel goes to Willy's bar for information, and Willy finally confirms Angel's suspicions that Spike is behind the assassins. Before Angel can leave, he is attacked by the mysterious female. She locks him in a metal cage in front of an eastern window with only a few hours until sunrise.

Giles reveals that the missing manuscript contains a ritual to restore a weakened vampire back to health. Xander and Cordelia enter Buffy's house, and Xander searches for her while Cordelia waits downstairs. She hears a knock at the door and finds a door-to-door makeup salesman. He offers free samples, and Cordelia lets him in, but it is revealed he is the mealworm assassin. In Angel's bedroom, Buffy is attacked by the mysterious woman. They fight, and the woman tells Buffy that her name is Kendra the Vampire Slayer.

Part two 
Buffy and Kendra realize that they are both slayers, and they go to Giles for assistance in explaining the situation. They learn that Kendra was called when Buffy temporarily died in her fight with The Master in "Prophecy Girl". Meanwhile, Willy has saved Angel from certain death, but sold him out to Spike. Spike takes Angel back to the warehouse, where he will be held until he can be sacrificed to restore Drusilla to full strength.

Xander and Cordelia run and hide in the basement, although before long they are arguing with each other. After an unexpected kiss, they rush to escape, running past the attacking mealworm assassin. At school, Buffy, whose test results recommend a career in law enforcement, attends a career seminar. The police officer leading the seminar tries to shoot Buffy. Oz is shot and slightly injured as he pushes Willow out of harm's way. Kendra comes to Buffy's rescue, and they fight off the attacker. The Scoobies then gather in the library, where Giles announces that Spike intends for Angel to die in the ritual to restore Drusilla.

Angel is tortured by Drusilla, both emotionally and physically; she pours holy water on him as she reminds him of how he killed her whole family. Angel taunts Spike with insinuations that Spike is unable to satisfy Drusilla, in the hope that Spike will kill him before he can be used to cure Drusilla. Meanwhile, Kendra gains a newfound respect for Buffy's qualities as a slayer. Later, the slayers go after Willy to learn what happened to Angel; they force Willy to take them to the location of Spike and Angel. However, Willy leads them to the assassins, and the ritual has already begun. Buffy attacks Spike to save Angel, and Kendra and the Scooby Gang arrive to back her up. Xander and Cordelia lure the mealworm assassin underneath a door into a liquid glue trap. Willow and Giles stake a vampire while Buffy and Kendra fight several of their own. Spike starts a fire and rushes to rescue the unconscious Drusilla, hoping that the ritual has had time to cure her. Buffy prevents their exit, crushing them in falling rubble. She helps the weakened Angel exit the building.

With the danger over, it is time for Kendra to leave. Buffy and Kendra discuss their position as slayers. Kendra remarks that Buffy considers slaying to be a job when it is actually a part of who she is. The two, now friends, say their goodbyes, and Buffy is left with a new outlook on her position as the slayer, as well as the knowledge that she is no longer alone in her calling.

At the remains of the church, Spike lies seriously injured under the rubble. Drusilla rises, the ritual having worked and restored her to full power. She carries her partner out of the debris, promising to return the favor and make him as powerful as she.

Reception
Part one pulled in 3.5 million households on its original airing, while part two had an audience of 3.9 million households.

References

External links

 
 

Buffy the Vampire Slayer (season 2) episodes
1997 American television episodes
Television episodes about assassinations
Television episodes about abduction
Television episodes written by Marti Noxon

it:Episodi di Buffy l'ammazzavampiri (prima stagione)#La riunione